The railway from Athens Airport to Patras is a double-track, standard-gauge railway line in Greece that, when completed, will connect Athens International Airport with Patras, the country's third-largest city. One of the largest railway projects of the last 30 years in Greece, its completion is of major significance for the infrastructure of the entire region of the northern Peloponnese. , the line is completed until the city of Aigio. A 5.2 km underground section is planned for the final section from Kastellokampos to Agios Andreas in Patras. For most of the section between Athens Airport in East Attica and Mandra in West Attica, the line runs along the median strip of the Attiki Odos motorway.

Course

Main stations

The main stations on the Athens Airport–Patras railway are:
 Athens Airport Station
 Acharnes Railway Center (Interchange with the Athens-Thessaloniki Railway)
 Ano Liosia railway station
 Megara railway station
 Corinth railway station
 Kiato railway station
 Aigio railway station

Services

, the Athens Airport–Patras railway is used by the following passenger services, all part of the Athens Suburban Railway (Proastiakos) network:
 Line 1: Piraeus–Athens–Airport (also uses the Athens-Thessaloniki Railway)
 Line 2: Piraeus–Athens–Kiato (also uses the Athens-Thessaloniki Railway)
 Line 4: Ano Liosia–Koropi–Airport
 Line 5: Aigio–Kiato–Athens/Airport

Future
As part of the P.A.Th.E./P. project, the line is being extended to Patras. The remaining part from Rio to Patras will be partly underground with a terminus in the new harbour. The existing train station of Patras will get a new function in a new recreational space. The electrification of the Kiato–Aigio section will allow direct services to and from Athens, as passengers must currently change between electric and diesel trains at Kiato.
On the south-eastern side, the line will be prolonged up to Lavrio and Rafina. A tender note has been published by ERGOSE SA, with Jan 14th 2022 deadline.

Gallery

References

External links
OSE
Trainose

Railway lines in Greece
Standard gauge railways in Greece
Railway lines opened in 2005
Railway lines in highway medians